Raven Klaasen and Izak van der Merwe were the defending champions, but they both chose to not participate this year.

Jordan Kerr and David Martin won the tournament by defeating James Ward and Michael Yani in the final, 6–3, 6–4.

Seeds

Draw

Draw

References
 Doubles Draw

Fifth Third Bank Tennis Championships - Doubles
2011 MD